The Economic Secretary to the Treasury is the sixth-most senior ministerial post in His Majesty's Treasury, after the First Lord of the Treasury, the Chancellor of the Exchequer, the Chief Secretary to the Treasury, the Paymaster-General and the Financial Secretary to the Treasury. It is not a cabinet-level post.

The office is currently of Minister of State rank, and is shadowed by the Shadow Economic Secretary to the Treasury.

History
The office was created in November 1947. In 1961, the Economic Secretary became junior to the new office of Chief Secretary to the Treasury, which held a seat in cabinet.

Following the establishment of the Department of Economic Affairs in 1964, the Economic Secretary, Anthony Crosland, transferred to become Minister of State in that department. The post of Economic Secretary to the Treasury was abolished on 22 December 1964. Although the Department of Economic Affairs closed in 1969, the Treasury post was not re-established until 11 November 1981.

From April 2014 to September 2022 the office of Economic Secretary to the Treasury was held concurrently with the portfolio of 'City Minister'.

Responsibilities
The Economic Secretary is responsible, though more senior ministers share in decision-making, for the answering of written and verbal parliamentary questions and for the devising of regulations, orders and legislation in various matters. Until September 2022, these matters included banking and finance, including banks, insurance, personal savings, financial regulation, and foreign exchange reserves. He or she was also involved in taxation as it impacted on these areas, such as tax on savings and pensions, and Insurance Premium Tax. In addition, the Economic Secretary, until September 2002, advised on economic policy and continues to work with other Treasury ministers on the Comprehensive Spending Review and finance bills.

Economic Secretaries to the Treasury, 1947–present

Colour key (for political parties):

See also
Secretary to the Treasury

References

Lists of government ministers of the United Kingdom
1947 establishments in the United Kingdom